Computer mathematics may refer to:

 Automated theorem proving, the proving of mathematical theorems by a computer program
 Symbolic computation, the study and development of algorithms and software for manipulating mathematical expressions and other mathematical objects
 Computational science, constructing numerical solutions and using computers to analyze and solve scientific and engineering problems
 Theoretical computer science, collection of topics of computer science and mathematics that focuses on the more abstract and mathematical aspects of computing